Dimitris Kontopoulos (Greek: Δημήτρης Κοντόπουλος born November 9, 1971, in Athens, Greece) is a Greek music composer.

Personal life
Dimitris Kontopoulos was born in Athens, Greece on November 9, 1971. After graduating from the Ziridis school, he continued his studies in film scoring at Berklee College of Music in Boston, Massachusetts and the University of Southern California in Los Angeles, California.

Kontopoulos is married and has two children.

Career
Kontopoulos became active in the music industry in 1999–2000. In 1999 he released as a producer the album 'Etsi ime ego' by Iro. The singles of the album 'Etsi eime ego' and 'Tipota' topped the Greek charts making the producer famous nationally. In 2001, he released the second album of Iro as a producer and composer. The singles 'Apogeiosi', 'Etsi eine oi sxeseis' and 'Moni mou' also topped the charts. In 2002, he produced and composed the album of Giannis Vardis. The first single of the album 'Gia ena lepto' topped all charts and remained at the first spot of the National Airplay Chart for over 12 weeks. In 2003 he became involved with the Eurovision Song Contest when he wrote the song "Mia Stigmi" sung by Giannis Vardis. The song competed in the national final to represent Greece in the Eurovision Song Contest 2003, but came in second place to Mando and 'Never Let You Go' which went to Eurovision. Though the entry did not win the national final, it topped the charts in Greece for 11 weeks. Also in 2003 he started to compose the music for a movie of the famous Greek director Nikos Perakis. The song of the movie 'Meine mazi mou apopse' reached the number one position in the charts. In 2004 he composes the song 'Esena mono' for famous Greek singer Katy Garbi.

In 2005, Kontopoulos again wrote a song for Eurovision, but this time for Russia. "Shadows" performed by Anastasia Stotskaya placed third in the Russian national final. In 2006 Kontopoulos composed the score of the popular television series 'Loufa kai Parallagi'. The song of the 'Pano stin trela mou' won the first spot of the Annual National Airplay Chart.

In 2006, with Greece hosting the Eurovision Song Contest after Elena Paparizou's victory with the song "My number one", he once again tried to take part in the Greek final as a composer, this time for Anna Vissi. That year, the Greek audience selected four songs including "Welcome to the party" written by Kontopoulos. At the national final, the song came in second with Nikos Karvelas's 'Everything' going to the contest.

In 2007, Kontopoulos composed the song 'Ola giro sou girizoun' for Sakis Rouvas. The song remained for more than a year in the top 50 of the National Airplay Chart.
 
Having taken a break in 2007, Kontopoulos returned with the dance pop song 'Always and forever' sung by Kostas Martakis. At the national final, the song came in second but it entered for many years the playlist of international Abercrombie and Fitch stores. In 2008 he produced the song 'Shady Lady' composed by Philipp Kirkorov and performed by Ani Lorak who represented the Ukraine at the Eurovision song contest and placed second.

In 2009 Kontopoulos composed the song ' Kai se thelo' for Sakis Rouvas. It remained at the first spot of the National Airplay chart for 8 weeks and the song became a cover in Bulgaria and Estonia. In 2009 Kontopoulos also produced and composed the album 'Solnce' of Ani Lorak. For the song 'Solnce' of the album he won a Russian Grammy award in the Golden Grammofon awards at the Kremlin. On July 19, 2008, it was announced that Dimitris Kontopoulos would be the composer for Sakis Rouvas and Greece in the Eurovision Song Contest 2009. He composed three songs: 'Out of control', 'Right on Time', and 'This is our night' which were voted on at the national final in February 2009.
The song titled 'This is our night' got the most votes and thus represented Greece at the Eurovision Song Contest 2009, which took place in Moscow. After the results of the jury and the tele-voting were announced, the song was placed seventh on the final scoreboard. In 2010 he released a new song for Sakis Rouvas titled 'Spase ton hrono'. The song topped the Greek charts for months. In March 2010 Kontopoulos became a member of the jury of the Greek Idol show. In September 2010 Kontopoulos released the new song of Sakis Rouvas called 'Parafora'. The song was in the number one spot of the National Airplay Chart for weeks. In December of the same year Kontopoulos released the ballad 'Einai stigmes', performed by Antonis Remos. In February 2011 Sakis Rouvas released his new song 'Oi dyo mas' by Kontopoulos. In March the song topped the National Airplay chart becoming the 6th song of the duo Kontopoulos/Rouvas that topped the charts. 
In September 2011, the three top Greek male artists released songs of Dimitris Kontopoulos: Antonis Remos released as a single the song "Tora Epizo", Sakis Rouvas the song "Kane na mi sagapiso" and Michalis Hatzigiannis performed the song "Axizo" of the movie "Loufa kai parallagi: Seirines stun Steria".

In summer 2012 Kontopoulos composed the song "Poses hiliades kalokairia" sung by Demy.In December 2012 Michalis Hatzigiannis and hip hop artist Midenistis performed the song of Kontopoulos "Se ena toixo" which remained for 15 weeks at the first place of the National Airplay chart. In January 2013 Dimitris Kontopoulos composed the song "H agapi erxete sto telos" for the advertisement of Lacta chocolate, the song was performed by Antonis Remos stayed for 4 months on the second place of the national airplay chart while the advertisement won 3 Cannes Lions awards as the best advertisement of the decade. In December 2013 Helena Paparizou released his song "Iroas" that entered the top 10 National Airplay chart for 4 weeks while a week later one of the most popular Greek artists Despina Vandi released his song "Hano esena". The song remained at the first place of the Greek airplay chart for 11 weeks. In February 2014 it was announced that Kontopoulos will be the mentor of Vandi at the Greek edition of the Voice TV show.

In May 2013 Dimitris Kontopoulos participated at the Eurovision Song Contest with Azerbaijan. His song "Hold me" performed by Farid Mammadov came second with 234 points, the most points that Azerbaijan has ever received at the Eurovision Song Contest.While it received the maximum 12 points from 10 countries.Kontopoulos is one of the two composers of the song "Shine" of The Tolmachevy Sisters which took part in the Eurovision Song Contest 2014 for Russia.

In May 2016 Dimitris Kontopoulos participated at the Eurovision Song Contest with Russia. His song "You're the only one" performed by Sergey Lazarev came third with 491 points, despite winning the televote. In 2017, he was the composer for Demy and Greece in the Eurovision Song Contest 2017. He composed three songs: 'Where the time comes around', 'Angels', and 'This is love' which were voted on at the national final in March 2017. The song titled 'This is love' got the most votes and thus represented Greece at the Eurovision Song Contest 2017, which took place in Kyiv. After the results of the jury and the tele-voting were announced, the song was placed 19th on the final, the second-worst result that Kontopoulos has ever had at the Eurovision Song Contest as composer. He got his worst result 2018 with the Song X my heart by Aisel Məmmədova which became 11th in the first semi final and did not qualify.

In the Eurovision Song Contest 2019 he was more successful with a 3th place in the grand final for the song Scream by Sergey Lazarev. In 2020 he won the Moldovian pre-selection O melodie pentru Europa for the Eurovision Song Contest 2020 with the song Prison by Natalia Gordienko. He also wrote the song SUPERG!RL for the Greek singer Stefania. Because of the COVID-19 pandemic the contest was cancelled and the songs did not compete on stage.

For the Eurovision Song Contest 2021 he wrote the songs Sugar for Natalia Gordienko (Moldova) and Last dance for Stefania (Greece). Both qualified for the Grand final and Sugar became 13th, Last dance 10th, the first Top-10 position for Greece since 2013.

Kontopoulos has to-date composed and produced 14 albums, out of which 8 have gone platinum and two of those twice platinum.

Awards
 2003 Arion Award (IFPI) Best Pop Album "Apogiosi", Iro
 2006 Arion Award (IFPI) Best Pop Song "Pano Stin Trela Mou", Vanesa Adamopoulou
 2006 Arion Award (IFPI) Best Soundtrack OST "Loufa & Paralagi"
 2007 Arion Award (IFPI) Best Pop Song "Ola Gyro Sou Girizoun", Sakis Rouvas

Production discography
 "Etsi Eimai Ego" - Iro
 "Apogeiosi" - Iro
 "Koita Me Anteho" - Iro
 "Emmones Idees" (2003) - Katy Garbi
 "Meine Mazi Mou Apopse" (2003) - Irini Merkouri
 "I Liza Kai I Alli" - Kostas Doxas
 "Pes Mou Ti Niotheis" - Giannis Vardis
 "Yalina Oneira" - Aspa Tsina
 "Thelo Na Matho" - Antonis Vardis
 "Koita Me" (2002) - Giorgos Mazonakis
 "Argises" - Aleka Kanellidou
 "Krifo Fili" (2002) - Michalis Hatzigiannis
 "Dekapentavgoustos" - Michalis Delta
 "Marina Handri" - Marina Handri
 "Tha Skisi I Omada" (2004) - All Stars
 "Schedon Pote" - Apostolia Zoi
 Iparhi Agapi Edo (2006) - Sakis Rouvas
 This Is My Live (2007) - Sakis Rouvas
 Irthes (2008) - Sakis Rouvas
 Solntse (2009) - Ani Lorak
 Giro Apo T'Oneiro - Elena Paparizou
 Parafora - Sakis Rouvas
 Entasi'' - Kostas Martakis

Eurovision Song Contest

Production Credits 
 2012:  "We Are the Heroes" by Litesound, 16th (semifinal)
 2020:  "What Love Is" by Uku Suviste, Cancelled
 2021:  "The Lucky One" by Uku Suviste, 13th (semifinal)
2021:  "Karma" by Anxhela Peristeri, 21st

Eurovision Pre-Selections 

 1998:  "Se Nostalgo" by Vivetta Koursi, 3rd
 2003:  "Mia Stigmi" by Giannis Vardis, 2nd
 2005:  "Shadows" by Anastasia Stotskaya, 3rd
 2006:  "Welcome to the Party" by Anna Vissi, 2nd
 2008:  "Always and Forever" by Kostas Martakis, 2nd
 2009:  "Out of Control" by Sakis Rouvas, 3rd
 2009:  "Right on Time" by Sakis Rouvas, 2nd
 2009:  "This is Our Night" by Sakis Rouvas, 1st
 2017:  "Angels" by Demy, 3rd
 2017:  "This is Love" by Demy, 1st
 2017:  "When the Morning Comes Around" by Demy, 2nd
 2020:  "Prison" by Natalia Gordienko, 1st

Movies
 "I Liza kai i alli"
 "Vitsia gynaikon"
 "Dekapentaugoustos"
 "E.D.E.M."
 "Apoliti Stigmi"
 "Giro Giro Oloi"
 "Money Go Round"
 "The Midnight Kicker"
 "How To Escape"
 "Christmas Gift"
 "Trapped"
 "Loufa kai paralagi, sirines sto Aigaio"
 "Psyhraimia"

Theatre
 "Kammena Vourla"
 Ta paidia stin exousia"
 "Oliki Eklipsi"
 Ta dakria tis Kleitemnistras"
 "Franky and Johnny"

TV
 "Schedon pote"
 "Ola edo plirononte"

Commercial
 Bold & Ogilvy
 Leousi
 Status
 AudioVisual
 Kino
 Stefi
 Anosi
 Red Code
 Ekso
 Max
 Foss
 Comrade
 Modiano
 Studio ATA
 Upstream

References

External links
 http://www.voxstudios.gr Official Website of the Studio
 
 Dimitris Kontopoulos on Twitter

1971 births
Berklee College of Music alumni
Greek songwriters
USC Thornton School of Music alumni
Living people
Musicians from Athens